A mòd is an Eisteddfod-inspired festival of Scottish Gaelic song, arts and culture. Historically, the Gaelic word mòd, which came from Old Norse mót, refers to a Viking Age Thing or a similar kind of assembly. There are both local mòds, and an annual national mòd, the Royal National Mòd. Mòds are run under the auspices of An Comunn Gàidhealach. The term comes from a Gaelic word for a parliament or congress in common use during the Lordship of the Isles.
A Mòd largely takes the form of formal competitions. Choral events (in Gaelic, both solo and choirs), and traditional music including fiddle, bagpipe and folk groups dominate. Spoken word events include children's and adult's poetry reading, storytelling and Bible reading, and categories such as Ancient Folk Tale or Humorous Monologue. Children can also present an original drama, and there are competitions in written Scottish Gaelic literature.  Unlike the National Mòd, local mòds usually only last a day or two. They attract a much smaller crowd and the only notable social event is the winners' ceilidh. As there are fewer competitions than in the National Mòd, this ceilidh is often more like a traditional ceilidh with dancing and guest singers between the winners' performances.

Culturally, mòds are comparable to an Irish Feis or Seachtain na Gaeilge or the Welsh eisteddfod, but without the ancient history or the fanciful 18th-century "druidic" pageantry created and introduced into the National Eisteddfod of Wales by Iolo Morganwg.

In British Columbia, the Gaelic Society of Vancouver held a local Mòd biannually from 1990 to 2007.

The first US National Mòd was organized by Donald F. MacDonald, the founder of the Grandfather Mountain Highland games in North Carolina, and held at Alexandria, Virginia in 1988. The US National Mòd is now held as part of the annual Highland games at Ligonier, Pennsylvania and sponsored by An Comunn Gàidhealach Ameireaganach ("The American Scottish Gaelic Society").

List of mòds
Royal National Mòd
Caithness and Sutherland Mòd
Dalriada Mòd (Lochgilphead area)
Easter Ross Mòd
East Kilbride Mòd
Edinburgh Mòd
Glasgow Mòd
Harris Mòd
Inverness Mòd
Islay Mòd
Kyle Mòd
Lewis Mòd
Lochaber Mòd, based in Bun-sgoil Ghàidhlig Loch Abar
Oban Mòd
Mull Mòd
Perthshire and Angus Mòd
Skye Mòd
Stirling Mòd
Uist Mòd
Wester Ross Mòd
Ardnamurchan Mòd

Scottish diaspora
Nova Scotia Gaelic Mod
Vancouver Mòd (see Canadian Gaelic)
U.S. National Mòd, held annually as part of the Highland games at Ligonier, Pennsylvania and sponsored by An Comunn Gàidhealach Ameireaganach ("The American Scottish Gaelic Society").

See also

List of Celtic festivals
Celtic festivals

References

External links
An Comunn Gàidhealach with information about the Royal National Mòd and provincial Mòds
Picture

Cultural festivals in the United Kingdom
Scottish Gaelic language
Music festivals in Scotland
Scotland-related lists
Folk festivals in Scotland
Arts festivals in Scotland
Literary festivals in Scotland
Cultural festivals in Scotland
Celtic music festivals